Poliske Raion was a raion (district) in Kyiv Oblast of Ukraine. Its administrative center was the urban-type settlement of Krasiatychi. The raion was abolished on 18 July 2020 as part of the administrative reform of Ukraine, which reduced the number of raions of Kyiv Oblast to seven. The area of Poliske Raion was merged into Vyshhorod Raion.

At the time of disestablishment, the raion consisted of one hromada, Poliske settlement hromada with the administration in Krasiatychi.

The raion was invaded by Russia on 24th February 2022.

See also
Poliske
Vilcha
Chernobyl Exclusion Zone

References

External links

Former raions of Kyiv Oblast
Chernobyl Exclusion Zone
1923 establishments in Ukraine
Ukrainian raions abolished during the 2020 administrative reform